Gaige is a surname. Notable people with the name include:

Amity Gaige (born 1972), American novelist
Frederick McMahon Gaige (1890–1976), American entomologist and herpetologist
Helen Beulah Thompson Gaige (1890–1976), American herpetologist
Jeremy Gaige (1927–2011), American chess archivist and journalist

See also
Gaige Homestead, a historic home in Schenectady County, New York
Gaige the Mechromancer, a character in the video game Borderlands 2
Gage (disambiguation)
Gauge (disambiguation)